Nymanomyces is a genus of fungi within the Rhytismataceae family. It has been found in the Caribbean.

The genus name of Nymanomyces is in honour of Erik Olof August Nyman (1866-1900), who was a Swedish botanist (Mycology and Bryology) who studied plants on Java and New Guinea. 

The genus was circumscribed by Paul Christoph Hennings in Monsunia vol.1 on page 28 in 1899.

References

External links 

 Nymanomyces at Index Fungorum

Leotiomycetes